Guangxitoxin, also known as GxTX, is a peptide toxin found in the venom of the tarantula Plesiophrictus guangxiensis. It primarily inhibits outward voltage-gated Kv2.1 potassium channel currents, which are prominently expressed in pancreatic β-cells, thus increasing insulin secretion.

Sources
Guangxitoxin is found in the venom of the tarantula Plesiophrictus guangxiensis, which lives mainly in Guangxi province of southern China.

Chemistry

Subtypes
Guangxitoxin consists of multiple subtypes, including GxTX-1D, GxTX-1E and GxTX-2. GxTX-2 shows sequence similarities with Hanatoxin (HaTX), Stromatoxin-1 (ScTx1), and Scodra griseipes toxin (SGTx) peptides. GxTX-1 shows sequence similarities with Jingzhaotoxin-III (JZTX-III), Grammostola spatulata mechanotoxin-4 (GsMTx-4), and Voltage-sensor toxin-1 (VSTX1) peptides. GxTX-1 consists of two variants, GxTX-1D and GxTX-1E, of which GxTX-1E is a more potent inhibitor of Kv2.1.

Sequence
GxTX-1D and GxTX-1E consist of 36 amino acids, differing only a single amino acid at the NH2-terminal, aspartate or glutamate, respectively:

Asp/Glu-Gly-Glu-Cys-Gly-Gly-Phe-Trp-Trp-Lys-Cys-Gly-Ser-Gly-Lys-Pro-Ala-Cys-Cys-Pro-Lys-Tyr-Val-Cys-Ser-Pro-Lys-Trp-Gly-Leu-Cys-Asn-Phe-Pro-Met-Pro

GxTX-2 consists of 33 amino acids, which has only 9 identical amino acids in corresponding sequence compared to GxTX-1D and GxTX-1E:

Glu-Cys-Arg-Lys-Met-Phe-Gly-Gly-Cys-Ser-Val-Asp-Ser-Asp-Cys-Cys-Ala-His-Leu-Gly-Cys-Lys-Pro-Thr-Leu-Lys-Tyr-Cys-Ala-Trp-Asp-Gly-Thr

Structure 
The three-dimensional NMR structure of the toxin reveals an amphipathic part and an inhibitor cystine knot (ICK) motif.
The amphipathic part is composed of a large cluster characterized by solvent-exposed hydrophobic residues which is enclosed by acidic and basic residues. The ICK motif contains three disulfide bonds stabilizing the toxin structure. The conserved amphipathic structure assists in binding the toxin and can be explained since similar toxins allocate into lipid membranes effectively with the help of this structure and interact with Kv channels from within the membrane. Differences in distribution of acidic and basic residues compared to SGTx-1 may contribute to the difference in affinity of GxTX-1E for the Kv2.1 channel. Dissimilarities in orientation of loops and turns compared to JZTX-III may contribute to the discrepancy in selectivity of GxTX-1E to the Kv2.1 channel.

Target
GxTX-1E inhibits voltage-gated Kv2.1 channels by modifying its voltage-dependent gating,. mutations in the S3b-S4 paddle motif of the voltage-sensing domain of Kv2.1 reduce affinity for tarantula toxins. Two other voltage-gated potassium channels inhibited by GxTX-1 are the Kv2.2 and Kv4.3 channels. Kv2.2 is located predominantly in δ-cells of primate islets. Kv4.3 is mainly of importance in the heart.

The Kv2.1 channel is predominantly expressed in pancreatic β-cells and in the central nervous system. In pancreatic β-cells, Kv2.1 comprises 60% of the currents mediated by Kv channels. Furthermore, the Kv2.1 channel shows similar biophysical properties to the delayed rectifier K+ current (IDR) of the β-cells. This makes GxTX appropriate to study the physiological role of the aforementioned current as it inhibits 90% of the β-cell IDR. The IDR is thought to play an important role in repolarization of action potentials. Both the Kv2.2 and Kv4.3 channels are believed not to contribute significantly to the β-cell IDR.

GxTX-1E has no effect on voltage-gated Na+ or Ca2+ channels.

Mode of action
Inhibition of Kv2.1 by GxTX-1E causes a shift in voltage-dependency of activation toward more positive potentials of almost 100 mV. Moreover, GxTX-1E also exhibits properties of decreasing the velocity of hKv2.1 channel opening and increasing the velocity of Kv2.1 channel closing approximately sixfold.
By inhibiting Kv2.1 potassium channels, GxTX-1E boosts action potentials of pancreatic β-cells causing mainly increased glucose-stimulated intracellular calcium oscillations which in turn intensifies glucose-stimulated insulin secretion.
How GxTX-1E is able to generate distinctive calcium oscillations in different cells remains unclear (broader oscillations, increased frequency or restoration of oscillations), however, the specificity of GxTX-1E points in the direction of IDR inhibition causing these effects. Notably, GxTX-1E stimulated insulin secretion is specifically glucose dependent, considering that IDR is only active above -20mV membrane potentials which is only seen in raised glucose levels.

Therapeutic use
Unlike KATP channel blockers, GxTX-1 primarily blocks IDR and demonstrates a potential target for future drugs in diabetes mellitus type 2 treatment, since a blockade of IDR should not provoke hypoglycaemia.

References 

Ion channel toxins
Spider toxins